The University Athletic Association of the Philippines (UAAP), established in 1938, is an athletic association of eight Metro Manila universities in the Philippines. The eight-member schools are Adamson University (AdU), Ateneo de Manila University (ATENEO), De La Salle University (DLSU), Far Eastern University (FEU), National University (NU), University of the East (UE), University of the Philippines Diliman (UP), and the University of Santo Tomas (UST). Varsity teams from these universities compete annually in the league's 31 events from 17 disciplines to vie for the overall championship title, namely, 3x3 basketball, badminton, baseball, basketball, beach volleyball, chess, fencing, football, judo, softball, swimming, table tennis, taekwondo poomsae, taekwondo kyorugi (sparring), tennis, track and field, and volleyball.

History
In 1924, seeing the need to organize collegiate sports and set general athletic policies, Dr. Regino Ylanan (the University of the Philippines Physical Education Director) met with representatives of Ateneo de Manila, De La Salle College, San Beda College, National University, University of Manila, University of Santo Tomas, and Institute of Accounts (now Far Eastern University) to discuss possibilities of forming an athletic organization, which eventually became the University Athletic Association of the Philippines  (UAAP).

In 1930, the University of the Philippines sponsored an experimental meet of the "Big 3" of the league (NU, UP, UST) on basketball, football, baseball, volleyball, swimming, track and field, boxing, and tennis.

The following year (1931), the NCAA Board of Directors divided the meet into three divisions to put competition on a fairer basis and to stimulate athletics among a greater number.

In March 1932, NU, UP, and UST formally seceded from the NCAA. Led by UP's Candido C. Bartolome, NU's Leon Tirol and UST's Fr. Silvestre Sancho, OP, the move was made to put competitions on equal footing, to increase amateur athletic competitions and to separate the universities from the college members of the league. On April 6, the "Big 3 League" is born. On August 14, the "Big 3" Association is inaugurated with a meet that starts with basketball. Other events were baseball, football, volleyball, relays, track and field, swimming and tennis.

In 1935, UP did not participate in the "Big 3 League" because of mass intramurals at the state university. NU and UST held the meet with FEU (formerly Institute of Accounts) taking UP's place.

On September 27, 1938, the University of the Philippines Alumni Association and the Philippine Amateur Athletic Federation (PAAF), then the highest sports body in the country, encouraged the original "Big 3 League" and FEU to form a permanent sports association, thus the University Athletic Association of the Philippines was established. Events included were basketball, baseball, football, women's volleyball, swimming and track and field. UP bagged three titles (baseball, volleyball, track and field). UST was tops in football and swimming and FEU triumphed in basketball.

In 1941, the outbreak of World War II hindered the staging of the 1941–42 UAAP with UST failing to complete its term. UAAP competition was not held from 1942 to 1946 due to the Japanese occupation of the country which resulted in the closure of educational institutions. The UAAP competition resumed in 1947.
 
In 1952, University of the East, Adamson University, Manila Central University, and University of Manila were granted two-year probationary membership to the UAAP. After the two-year probationary period, UE and MCU was accepted as a regular member into the league in 1954. MCU remained until its pull-out in 1962. The other two universities (Adamson and UM) were dropped from the UAAP due to their inability to comply with the league requirements. 

In 1970, Adamson University reapplied for admission to the league with a two-year probationary period and in 1974, Adamson successfully hosted the 1974–75 athletic season paving the way for its permanent membership into the league.

In 1978, the UAAP admitted Ateneo de Manila University into the league while De La Salle University joined in 1986.

In 2020, the 2019-20 competition was initially intended to end in May that year. However, the competition abruptly ended early in April due to the outbreak of COVID-19 pandemic. Because of the ongoing pandemic, the planned 2020-21 tournament was cancelled, the first in peacetime. The league resumed the tournament on March 26, 2022 with its 84th season.

Logo

The previous UAAP logo features the university colors of the eight member-schools of the league in a circular formation. It also bears the year when the league was established, 1938, in the center.

The seal changes every season where the university colors of the season host is placed on the very top. Nonetheless, the arrangement of the colors never changes.

The colors of University of the Philippines (green and maroon), University of Santo Tomas (gold and white), Far Eastern University (green and gold), and National University (blue and gold) come first, clockwise. These are followed by the colors of Ateneo de Manila University (sky blue and white), De La Salle University (green and white), Adamson University (navy blue and white), and University of the East (red and white).

Prior to the start of UAAP Season 84 in March 2022, the league unveiled its new logo on December 17, 2021. The new logo was inspired by the Philippine traditional native sport sipa.

Member universities
The following are the member universities of the league:

Notes:

Membership timeline

Sports

Member universities compete in 14 sports. Basketball, being the most popular sport in the Philippines, is the most watched and most supported among all the sports.

All of these sports have Men's and Women's divisions, with the exception of baseball, in which only men participate, and softball, which is for women only. The following sports have a high school division, in which the associated high schools of the universities participate: volleyball, table tennis, chess, swimming, fencing, and track and field have Boys' and Girls' divisions. Meanwhile, baseball and football have a Boys' division only. Basketball staged Girls' division competitions starting Season 82 albeit as demo sport only.

Proposed expansion

As of now, five of the eight member universities — the Ateneo de Manila University, the National University (Philippines)  the De La Salle University, the University of the Philippines, and the University of Santo Tomas. During a UAAP Board meeting in Season 76 (2013–14), a proposal was made to add golf and gymnastics to the league's sporting events. This was turned down by the board, and instead a resolution was passed encouraging its member-schools to participate in all of the league's events, a goal the organization would like to achieve in the near future.

As of Season 82 (2019–20), only five sports in the Collegiate division have a complete roster from the eight member schools. These sports are basketball, indoor and beach volleyball, chess, and men's football. In the High School division, only boys' basketball and boys'table tennis have full participation. High School added girls' basketball in Season 82.

Perennial overall champions UST and La Salle, as well as UP and Ateneo, have teams in all events, thus giving them an advantage for the general championship.

Swimming has no participants from FEU in both the men's and women's divisions. NU, which has undergone the biggest buildup particularly in basketball, volleyball and tennis, have yet to take part in judo (men and women), football (women), and fencing (women).

In taekwondo, Adamson is not maintaining a men's and women's team; and Adamson and UE, a poomsae squad. FEU also does not have a team in judo.

Football, which has gained popularity, also is incomplete. Adamson and UE do not have women's teams. Water polo and futsal will be future events in Seniors and High School. In tennis, there are no Adamson and FEU teams in the men's and no UE, Adamson and FEU in the women's.

Fencing has been missing Adamson in the men's, and Adamson and NU in the women's. Softball has seven teams without FEU, and baseball six, without FEU and UE.

With that goal, the UAAP would continue to defer action on the inclusion of other sports until full participation on the present sports is achieved in order to make the league more competitive, especially in the race for the general championship.

Sports calendar
Beginning Season 78, the league has shifted its sports schedule start from July to September because of the change in the academic calendars of most of its member universities.

First semester sports (September–December)
  Basketball (Collegiate) – October (Mall of Asia Arena, Smart Araneta Coliseum, Philsports Arena, Ynares Sports Center, UST Quadricentennial Pavilion)
  Badminton (Collegiate) – October (Centro Atletico Badminton Center – Cubao, Quezon City)
  Athletics – November (PhilSports Football and Athletics Stadium)
  Beach Volleyball (Collegiate) – November (SM Mall of Asia - Sands at SM by the Bay)
  Chess – November (Far Eastern University Diliman Sports Comples, Far Eastern University Institute of Technology Gym)
  Swimming – November (Teofilo Yldefonso Swimming Pool)
  Table Tennis – November (Makati Coliseum)
  Cheerdance (Coed) – December (Mall of Asia Arena, Smart Araneta Coliseum)
  Judo – December (Blue Eagle Gym, Ateneo de Manila University)
  Taekwondo – December (Blue Eagle Gym, Ateneo de Manila University)

Second semester sports (January–May)
  Basketball (High School) – January (Filoil Flying V Arena)
  Baseball – February (Rizal Memorial Baseball Stadium)
  Softball – February (Rizal Memorial Baseball Stadium)
  Volleyball (Collegiate) – February (Filoil Flying V Arena, Mall of Asia Arena, Smart Araneta Coliseum)
  Volleyball (High School) – February (Adamson University Gym – Ermita, Malate)
  Football – February (Moro Lorenzo and Ed Ocampo Football Fields, Ateneo de Manila University; FEU Diliman Football Field, Rizal Memorial Stadium)
  Fencing – February (Blue Eagle Gym, Ateneo de Manila University)
  Tennis – February (Rizal Memorial Tennis Center)
  3x3 – April

Rivalries

Ateneo–UP rivalry

A rivalry between the Ateneo de Manila University and the University of the Philippines, the country's 2 highest-ranked academic institutions for decades, existed even before the formation of the NCAA and UAAP. Students of UP would troop from Padre Faura to the Ateneo campus in Intramuros to play basketball with the Ateneans, which led to Ateneo forming the first organized cheering squad and pep band in the Philippines and what is now known as the Blue Babble Battalion. This would later become UAAP's "Battle of Katipunan" when both universities transferred to their respective campuses along Katipunan Avenue in Quezon City, and when the two schools began competing in the UAAP.

Despite both schools being featured in several UAAP Finals matchups in other events like men's football, the now-dubbed "Battle of Katipunan" garnered nationwide attention for the first time in UAAP history when third-seeded UP Fighting Maroons, after ending a 21-year long drought of Final Four appearance, overcame second-seeded Adamson Soaring Falcons' twice-to-beat advantage to advance to the finals for the first time since their 1986 championship to face defending champions Ateneo Blue Eagles in men's basketball in 2018. Since that season, excluding 2019, Ateneo and UP jointly figured in the championship series in UAAP men's basketball, with UP winning during Season 84 in 2022 via overtime in both opening and do-or-die games, and Ateneo winning in 2018 via sweep and Season 85 in 2022 via do-or-die game.

Ateneo–La Salle rivalry

The rivalry between Ateneo de Manila University and De La Salle University, widely regarded as Philippines' foremost collegiate rivalry for decades, has resulted in sold-out games (especially in women's volleyball and men's basketball) that attract several public figures in attendance, including politicians, movie stars, and foreign diplomats. It is also the foremost school rivalry in the UAAP since La Salle joined the UAAP from the NCAA in 1986. However, the rivalry dates back to the time when both schools were playing in the National Collegiate Athletic Association from 1924 until Ateneo transferred to the UAAP in 1978.

UP–UST rivalry

The cheerdance rivalry between University of the Philippines and University of Santo Tomas has been one of the most talked about rivalries in UAAP history. Since the inception of the cheerdance, UP and UST possess the best winning records, dominating the top podium finishes between the 1990s and early 2010s, including consecutive joint podium finishes by both schools from 1999 to 2008. Both schools' pep squads are famous for their stunts and high-energy performances. UST has won 8 cheerdance titles which included 5 straight victories from 2002 to 2006, while UP has won 8 cheerdance titles and completed podium finishes for a total of 20 years, the most for the event. Since 2010, the rivalry turned into a friendly one as both UP and UST supporters cheered their school cheers during the announcement of winners.

Although matches between these universities have not reached a rivalry status in sporting events outside of cheerdance, the battle between their respective teams may be referred to as "Separation of Church and State". UST is the sole pontifical university in the country wherein Pope Pius XII gave it the title "The Catholic University of the Philippines". UP, on the other hand, has been declared by the Philippine government as the country's "national university".

The popularity of the rivalry between the two universities diminished in the late 2010s in the cheerdance competition as a result of the rise of other pep squads. It gained greater prominence when the two teams competed against each other in the UAAP Season 82 men's basketball semifinals. The Growling Tigers swept the Fighting Maroons, who had the twice-to-beat advantage, to return to the UAAP Finals.

La Salle–UST rivalry

Both were known for their numerous basketball championship matches in the 1990s with UST winning four straight titles from 1993 to 1996, the last three of which were at the expense of the Green Archers at the UAAP Finals. In 1997, La Salle eliminated UST in the semifinals to deny the Growling Tigers of a fifth consecutive championship title. In 1999, La Salle defeated the Growling Tigers to win the basketball crown and achieved their own 4-peat championship streak from 1998 to 2001. Their basketball rivalry diminished in latter years because of UST's decline.

It became a celebrated rivalry in women's volleyball, as the Lady Spikers and the Tigresses met three times in the championship of the Shakey's V-League tournament. UST won the first and La Salle winning the latter two. The Tigresses have won 5 championships while the Lady Spikers have 3 under their belt.

The women's volleyball rivalry was carried over to the UAAP. The DLSU Lady Spikers and the UST Tigresses met in the UAAP Finals for two consecutive seasons – Season 72 (won by UST) and Season 73 (won by La Salle). But, UST struggled in the succeeding seasons. Both schools met in the semifinals in Season 79 (won by La Salle) and Season 81 (won by UST). In Season 81, UST ended La Salle's decade-long streak of finals appearances (running from 2009 to 2018). It was the longest in the Final Four era of UAAP volleyball.

FEU–UE rivalry

The rivalry between Far Eastern University and University of the East started in the 1950s. Tagged as the "Battle of the East", these two schools, along with UST, have the winningest basketball squads in the league (FEU having won 20 basketball championships while UE having won 18 titles).

La Salle–FEU rivalry

The rivalry was sparked after the Season 54 Basketball Finals in 1991 when La Salle's final game win was protested by FEU after a Green Archer was admitted into the playing court after being disqualified. The UAAP Board upheld the protest and ordered the replay. The protest was taken up by FIBA, the highest international governing body in basketball. FIBA and the Basketball Association of the Philippines (BAP) supported La Salle's stand on the issue. La Salle did not show up, claiming to have won legitimately, and FEU was awarded the trophy by default. La Salle then had their victory parade pass through all UAAP schools – when they passed through the FEU campus, the motorcade was bombarded with debris.

The rivalry between DLSU and FEU has produced several momentous scenes and drama in UAAP Basketball history. FEU and La Salle faced each other in the UAAP Finals in 2004 and 2005, with the Green Archers prevailing in 2004 and FEU winning the year afterwards. However, La Salle's 2004 championship was forfeited and handed to the Tamaraws instead after a controversial ineligibility issue, which also caused DLSU's suspension in 2006.

DLSU and FEU has also faced several times in the finals of UAAP women's volleyball, most recently in 2018 when La Salle swept FEU en route to their 11th overall championship, but both teams were ousted in the Final Four by rising contemporary teams such as Ateneo and UST in 2019. La Salle has won 3 crowns over FEU in their head-to-head finals matchups, while FEU, having the most number of volleyball championship titles in the country (with a total of 29 titles in the league), has won 4 crowns over DLSU, most recently in Season 65 (2002). DLSU has the longest ongoing streak of Final Four appearances in UAAP volleyball (since 2009 in the women's division).

Adamson–UP rivalry 

The rivalry started when Adamson had the twice-to-beat advantage against UP in the UAAP Season 81 men's basketball semifinals. During that season, UP and Adamson were the only remaining schools that had yet to compete in the men's basketball championship round in the UAAP in the 21st century. After losing twice in the elimination rounds, UP defeated Adamson in two games, including the overtime in the do-or-die match, to pose their first appearance in the UAAP Finals in any of the league's marquee events in the 21st century.

Adamson–Ateneo rivalry

The Adamson Soaring Falcons and the Ateneo Blue Eagles did not have a well-known rivalry, but Adamson ended a 13-year, 29-match losing streak against Ateneo in the UAAP Season 74 basketball tournaments when they defeated Ateneo in the last game of the elimination round and denied the Blue Eagles of a thrice-to-beat advantage in the semifinals. Their rivalry, also referred to as the "Battle of the Birds", began in 2010, when they met in the finals of the Philippine Collegiate Championship League, a year before Ateneo was defeated once by Adamson in UAAP Season 74.

While Adamdon and Ateneo's UAAP men's basketball rivalry was rekindled by their semifinal matchup in UAAP Season 85, both notably competed in the playoffs of women's volleyball in UAAP Seasons 75, 76 and 84, with Ateneo prevailing in all mentioned matchups and, in the latter case, ousting Adamson from contention for the Final Four round.

UAAP championships

Overall
3x3 basketball
Badminton
Baseball
Basketball
Beach volleyball
Chess

Football
Fencing
Judo
Softball
Swimming
Table tennis
Taekwondo

Tennis
Track and field
Volleyball
Cheerdance
Formation dance
Street dance

Media
IBC (1979–1990) 
RPN (1991–1994)*
PTV (1995–1999)*
ABS-CBN Sports (2000–2020)
Studio 23 (2000–2013)
ABS-CBN (2010–2020) (selected games only)
Balls (2009–2015)
S+A (2014–2020)
ABS-CBN HD (2015–2020) (selected games only)
S+A HD (2016–2020)
Liga (2018–2020)
Cignal TV (2020–present)
TV5 (Final Four and Finals only)
One Sports
UAAP Varsity Channel (a dedicated sports channel)

Note: The telecast for RPN and PTV were produced by "Silverstar Sports", a production company founded by Louis Kierulf.

See also
National Collegiate Athletic Association (Philippines)
Premier Volleyball League

References

 
1938 establishments in the Philippines
Student sport in the Philippines
Sports organizations established in 1938
Student sports governing bodies